The North Edmonton Red Wings are a Canadian Junior B ice hockey team located in Edmonton, Alberta. They play in the Capital Junior Hockey League, out of the Derry. Their head coach is Wally Corse. The Red Wings were the 2015 Alberta provincial Junior B champions, and lost to the Campbell River Storm of the Vancouver Island Junior Hockey League in the final of the 2015 Keystone Cup.

Recent Season-by-season record

Note: GP = Games played, W = Wins, L = Losses, T = Ties, OTL = Overtime Losses, Pts = Points, GF = Goals for, GA = Goals against

Records as of 2014-15 season.

Russ Barnes Trophy
Alberta Jr B Provincial Championships

Keystone Cup history
Western Canadian Jr. B Championships (Northern Ontario to British Columbia)Six teams in round robin play. 1st vs 2nd for gold/silver; 3rd vs 4th for bronze.

See also

List of ice hockey teams in Alberta

References

Ice hockey teams in Alberta